Sea Tow is an international marine assistance provider headquartered in Southold, New York, United States.  Presently Sea Tow operates over 120 independently owned franchise locations in the United States, Europe, the Bahamas and Puerto Rico.

About
Sea Tow Services International is based in Southold, New York on the North Fork of Long Island. Sea Tow's 24-hour call center is located at the corporate headquarters.

In 2011 Sea Tow Services International Inc. was named to the Inc. 500|5000 list of fastest growing companies in the U.S. with a rank of 4802 having achieved 9% growth over the prior three years.

Optimum Lightpath named Sea Tow Services International the 2012 Customer Innovator of the Year for unique use of Ethernet-based services to drive communication efforts that help boaters in distress around the world.

References

External links
 Official site

Companies based in New York (state)
Southold, New York
Water transportation in New York (state)